Copa de Honor may refer to the following football competitions:

 Copa de Honor (Uruguay), Uruguayan football competition organized by the Uruguayan Football Association from 1905 to 1920
 Copa de Honor Cousenier, international football club competition which was played 13 times between representatives of the Argentina and Uruguay associations between 1905 and 1920
 Copa de Honor Municipalidad de Buenos Aires, Argentine official football cup competition. It was contested fourteen times between 1905 and 1920